The 1996 Reading Borough Council election was held on 2 May 1996, at the same time as other local elections across England. Sixteen of the 45 seats on Reading Borough Council were up for election, being the usual third of the council (15 seats) plus a by-election in Redlands ward, where Labour councillor Tony Jones had resigned.

Labour increased its majority on the council, and David Sutton remained leader of the Labour group and leader of the council. The Liberal Democrats became the second largest group on the council, overtaking the Conservatives, who were left with just four seats. The leader of the Conservative group ahead of the election was Tony Markham, but he lost his seat at the election. Ed Young was appointed leader of the Conservative group shortly afterwards. The Liberal Democrats also replaced their leader after the election, with outgoing leader Jim Day being appointed mayor of Reading, and Ian Fenwick appointed the new leader of the Liberal Democrat group in his place.

Results

Ward results
The results in each ward were as follows (candidates with an asterisk* were the previous incumbent standing for re-election):

References

1996 English local elections
1996